Xiamen North railway station is a railway station located in Houxi Town, Jimei District, Xiamen City, Fujian Province, China, on the Fuzhou-Xiamen railway and Xiamen-Shenzhen railway which operated by Nanchang Railway Bureau, China Railway Corporation. It was built to allow train lines that pass through Xiamen to continue to the south west rather than ending in Xiamen at Xiamen railway station. Due to this advantage it is now bigger than Xiamen railway station.

History
The construction of the new Xiamen station started on July 10, 2007. New Xiamen Station was renamed Xiamen North Station on April 9, 2010. Xiamen North Station opened on April 26, 2010.

As New Xiamen Station (located on the mainland, in Jimei District) was renamed Xiamen North Station, the station previously known as Xiamen North Station (located in the northern part of Xiamen Island, in Huli District, near the airport) was renamed Gaoqi railway station (高崎站). Gaoqi railway station is still in operation, as the terminal station for several comparatively low-speed (K-, L-, and no-letter series) trains.  The two stations are located on the opposite sides of the narrow strait separating Xiamen Island from the mainland, and should not be confused.

Line 1 of Xiamen Metro, finished in 2017, connects Xiamen North railway station with the island part of the city.

See also
Xiamen railway station

References

Railway stations in Fujian
Railway stations in China opened in 2010
Buildings and structures in Xiamen